Aurelie Sheehan is an American novelist and short story writer. She is the author of two novels, History Lesson for Girls (Penguin, 2004) and The Anxiety of Everyday Objects (Viking, 2006), as well as four collection of stories: Jack Kerouac Is Pregnant (Dalkey Archive, 1994), Jewelry Box (BOA, 2013), Demigods on Speedway (University of Arizona Press, 2014), and Once into the Night (FC2, 2019), winner of FC2's Catherine Doctorow Innovative Fiction Prize. She is a professor of creative writing at the University of Arizona in Tucson.

External links
 Official Site
 Pain  - Short story by Sheehan at "Guernica Magazine Big Truck - Short story at Guernica Magazine Wedding Party - Short story at Smyles and Fish''

American women writers
University of Arizona faculty
Living people
Year of birth missing (living people)
American women academics
21st-century American women